Casar Jacobson is a deaf Norwegian actor, scientist and UN disability rights campaigner https://sdgs.un.org/goals, from Vancouver, British Columbia. She is a disability, equality and gender rights activist, and United Nations Women Youth Champion.  She has also been a successful pageant contestant, winning multiple titles, including Miss Canada Globe.

Jacobson gradually became deaf in her twenties.

Early life and education 
Cäsar Jacobson was born in Norway and grew up in Austria until age four where she moved back home and lived in Norway, Canada, and Germany. She attended university in Germany attaining her M.Sc. where she had already begun needing assistance for communication. She had trouble with hearing since birth she was profoundly hard of hearing by her teens and become completely deaf in her twenties, eventually receiving a Cochlear Implant.

She completed her M.Sc. in genetics. In addition to that, she is also the first deaf person to graduate from Canada's Health Care Assistant program; currently, she is inspired to be a doctor.

Career 
In 2012 she was selected as audience favourite in Miss Universe Canada. In 2013 she won the title Miss British Columbia Globe 2012/2013. After that, she became Miss Canada Globe 2013. She traveled to Albania to compete in the Miss Globe pageant, in which she was awarded the title of "Miss Peace".

Jacobson is credited for appearing in ABC's The Good Doctor, Bomb City, Talk to the Hands, and The Murders.

Having lost her hearing in both ears, Jacobson is profoundly deaf. She is a disability activist and gender equality spokesperson for UN Global Compact Canada. Working with the United Nations entity as a Youth Champion and Planet 50/50 champion on Women Empowerment, Gender Equality, and a sub-sector in disabilities, Deaf culture and entrepreneurialism she also is involved in women's organizations and projects for women with disabilities worldwide.

Filmography

References

External links 
 Official website

Canadian beauty pageant winners
Canadian beauty pageant contestants
Living people
People from Vancouver
Canadian deaf people
Canadian disability rights activists
Youth activists
Canadian LGBT rights activists
Female models from British Columbia
Place of birth missing (living people)
1985 births